Harris J. Ryan (January 8, 1866 – July 3, 1934) was an American electrical engineer and a professor first at Cornell University and later at Stanford University. Ryan is known for his significant contributions to high voltage power transmission, for which he received the IEEE Edison Medal. Ryan was elected to the National Academy of Science in 1920 and served as president of the AIEE during 1923-1924.

Professor Ryan was a member of Sigma Xi, Phi Kappa Psi, and the Irving Literary Society.

External links
 Biography
 

IEEE Edison Medal recipients
Cornell University alumni
1866 births
1934 deaths
Members of the United States National Academy of Sciences
American electrical engineers
Cornell University faculty
Stanford University faculty